The Basketball World Cup was an international basketball tournament held in Turkey. Established in 2002, it was sponsored by the Turkish brewing company Efes Pilsen, which also runs a basketball club in Istanbul.

Winners 
 2002 - 
 2003 - 
 2004 - 
 2005 - 
 2006 - 
 2007 - 
 2008 - 
 2009 - 
 2010 - 
 2011 - 
 2013 -

See also 
 Acropolis International Basketball Tournament
 Adecco Cup
 Basketball at the Summer Olympics
 FIBA Asia Cup
 FIBA Basketball World Cup
 FIBA Diamond Ball
 FIBA Stanković Continental Champions' Cup
 Marchand Continental Championship Cup
 William Jones Cup

 
2002 establishments in Turkey
International basketball competitions hosted by Turkey
Recurring sporting events established in 2002
Basketball competitions in Europe between national teams